The Snow Riot was a riot and lynch mob in Washington, D.C., which began on August 11, 1835, when a mob of angry white mechanics attacked and destroyed Beverly Snow's Epicurean Eating House, a restaurant owned by a black man. This violence, born of white men's frustration about having to compete with free blacks for jobs, touched off several days of white mob violence against free blacks, their houses, and establishments.  It stopped only at President Andrew Jackson's intervention.

History
In 1835, the city of Washington was facing unprecedented tension between abolitionists and slavery defenders in the wake of Nat Turner's slave rebellion of 1831 and the revolt in Jamaica at the end of that year which, despite being defeated, resulted in the final abolition of slavery in the British colonies in 1833. The uprising had spread panic and fear across the slave states (including the District of Columbia). Abolitionists were flooding Congress with petitions to end slavery in the nation's capital, so many that the House adopted a series of gag rules to automatically table them. However, there were also a significant number of whites waiting for their moment to avenge the slave uprising of 1831.

The event that sparked the riots in 1835 was when an inebriated slave, Arthur Bowen, came into his mistress Anna Thorton's bedroom with an axe. Bowen did not strike or attempt to strike his mistress. However, the fact that a slave had the opportunity to rebel against slave owners and whites infuriated slavery defenders in the city. Bowen was ultimately taken into custody without harm, as this gave proslavery advocates an opportunity to go after the man they believed was leading the distribution of abolitionist material in Washington, Reuben Crandall. District Attorney Francis Scott Key, writer of the United States' national anthem, "The Star-Spangled Banner", was the leading man behind the arrest and prosecution of Crandall. Crandall was found innocent, and the incident publicly embarrassed Key and ended his political career.

That summer the nation experienced the first labor strike by federal employees, the 1835 Washington Navy Yard labor strike, which began on July 29, 1835, when Commodore Isaac Hull issued an order in response to thefts limiting workers' lunch privileges.  The Navy Yard strikers wanted a ten-hour day and for Hull to retract his order. The labor strike immediately exposed longstanding racial discord in the Yard. In a letter to the Secretary of the Navy, Mahlon Dickerson, Commodore Hull stated that 175 white mechanics and workers had joined the strike. This was the first strike by federal shipyard workers. Many scholars have found a "direct linkage between the Washington Navy Yard strike and riot. Both national and local events in 1835 combined to bring workers to strike, but long standing racial fears and anxieties moved the Yard’s white workers to take the lead in the "Snow Riot."

In an undated diary entry for August 1835, African-American diarist Michael Shiner confirmed intimidation by white workers and their demand that the black caulkers stop work [original spelling retained], "Commodore Hull ishsared and evry one of them struck and said they wouldnt work anny moore and at the same time they were collered man from Baltimore by the name of Israel Jones a caulker by Trade he was the forman Caulker of those Colerded Caulkers and they were fifteen or twenty of them here at that time Caulkin on the Columbia and the Carpenters made all of them knock oft two." On the same page Shiner relates there was "a Rumor flying around about a colered man by the name of Snow about an expression he had made about the Mechanics wifes god kowes wether he said those things or not and at that time snow kept a Restaurant on the Corner of six street and pennsilvanian west in the cellar and at the time all the Mechanics of classes gathered into snows Restaurant and broke him up Root and Branch and they were after snow but he flew for his life and that night after they had broke snow up they threatened to come to the navy yard after commodore Hull."  But they did not come that night and the next day Commodore Hull received orders from the Navy Department from the Hon Secretary of the Navy Mr Levy Woodbury Levi Woodbury to fortify the yard"? After breaking up his restaurant, the mechanics drank all of Snow's stock of whiskey and champagne. However, Snow had fled, and the white rioters were unable to locate him. Mobs of whites continued to attack all establishments run by free blacks: schools, churches, and businesses.

The strike had "quickly morphed into a race riot" as striking Washington Navy Yard white mechanics and laborers took out their resentment on the black population. This resulted in a huge mob of whites in the capital attacking all establishments run by free blacks: schools, churches and businesses. "White mechanics and carpenters on strike at the Navy Yard caught wind of a vicious rumor that further inflamed their anger and resentment. They heard a free black restaurateur named Beverley Snow had said something disrespectful about their wives and daughters." The first destination the mob attacked was Snow's Epicurean Eating House, a restaurant owned by Beverly Snow, who was known for serving sophisticated and luxurious food. It was ransacked by the mob, who were in search of Snow because of his status as a free black owner. However, the mob were unable to locate him. The pro-slavery  United States Telegraph justified the mob's violent actions against free blacks as primarily economic: "The reason of all these attacks on the blacks is, they enter into competition for work at a lower rate."

Josephine Seaton, the daughter of the publisher of the National Intelligencer, William Seaton, reflected in a letter on the strike and subsequent riot: "Snow will certainly be torn to pieces by the mechanics if he be caught, and they are in full pursuit of him. Unfortunately, several hundred mechanics of the navy yard are out of employment, who, aided and abetted by their sympathizers, create the mob, — the first I have ever seen, not recollecting those of Sheffield, and it is truly alarming."
 The perceptive Seaton was one of the few observers to see that the strike revealed the corrosive effects of racism on the Navy Yard workforce, as white workers sought to blame their own precarious economic situation on both free and enslaved African Americans. After days of disorder and riot, President Andrew Jackson ordered a company of U.S. Marines to restore order. After mediation, the Navy Yard labor strike ended on August 15, 1835. While the striking mechanics were allowed to return to work, they gained little from the strike; the subsequent riot left as part of its legacy a deep and abiding racial mistrust, which would linger. The city's black community, though, were the chief sufferers; they received no compensation for the destruction of their houses and churches. Blacks not only received no sympathy or aid, but the District Council quickly passed "a new ordinance aimed at them: (they not their attackers) were forbidden to assemble after sundown." For the next century, the history of the strike and Snow race riot remained an embarrassment to be glossed over and disassociated from the District of Columbia and Washington Navy Yard's official histories.

Background of Beverly Snow 
Beverly Randolph Snow was born of mixed parentage (he is referred to as a mulatto in various newspapers) in Lynchburg, Virginia, about 1799. He was born enslaved on the estate of Captain William Norvell. By the provisions of Norvell's last will, Snow was given to Norvell's daughter, Susannah Norvell Warwick, with the provision that Snow be manumitted at the age of 30. The Norvell family allowed Snow to operate a small oyster house on Lynch Street in Lynchburg, where he was allowed to keep some of the profits. During this time Snow married a young free woman named Julia. Snow was manumitted in November 1829. He and Julia left Virginia, which had harsh restrictions on free blacks, and moved into the District of Columbia, Washington City. Snow was different than most free blacks, as he was educated, wealthy, successful, and "perhaps even a bit snobbish". He was one of a number of black entrepreneurs who owned businesses in the downtown area. His success was evidence of the strength of Washington's free black population.

In Washington, D.C., Snow opened a popular restaurant, the Epicurean Eating House, located on the corner of 6th Street and Pennsylvania Avenue SE. This was the beginning of the Snow Riot of 1835. Beverly Snow's success made him the subject of white resentment and envy.

Snow's restaurant placed emphasis on sophisticated and healthy food cleverly advertised, with the practical message of "Health Bought Cheap." In August 1835, large mobs of white mechanics and laborers rampaged through the District, seeking to destroy property and terrorize free blacks. The mob, composed of mechanics on strike from the Washington Navy Yard, had heard a rumor that Snow had insulted their wives. Furthermore, the mob resented Snow's business success. Large numbers of these rioters entered his restaurant looking for him and proceeded to "bust up the entire facility". While doing so they drank all the whiskey and champagne. The mob later yelled "Now for Snow's house!" Breaking in, they looked for abolitionist literature; finding none, they destroyed the furniture. Unable to find Beverly Snow, the mob attacked black schools and churches. The riot became known as the "Snow Riot" or "Snow Storm."

Life after the Snow Riot
Snow and his wife, Julia, escaped from the rioters and moved to Toronto, Canada, where he again opened successful restaurants. His first venture was a coffee shop at the corner of Church and Colburn Street. He later opened the Epicurean Recess, then the Phoenix Saloon in 1848, followed by the Exchange Saloon in 1856. 

Snow died in Toronto on October 21, 1856. He and Julia are buried in the Toronto Necropolis.

See also
 1835 Washington Navy Yard labor strike
 List of incidents of civil unrest in the United States

References

Bibliography
 Asch, C. M. (January 1, 2012). Book Review: Snow-Storm in August: Washington City, Francis Scott Key, and the Forgotten Race Riot of 1835. Washington History, 24, 2, 168–170.
 Dickey, J.D. Empire of Mud The Secret History of Washington DC  Lyons Press:Guilford 2014, p. 128.
 Frederick Herald. "Mobs." Virginia Free Press [Charlestown, West Virginia] 20 Aug. 1835: n.p. 19th Century U.S. Newspapers. Web. 11 Nov. 2015.
 Morley, J. (2012). Snow-storm in August: Washington City, Francis Scott Key, and the forgotten race riot of 1835. New York: Nan A. Talese/Doubleday.
 Morley, J. (2013). Snow-storm in August: The struggle for American freedom and Washington's race riot of 1835.
 Shiner, M., Sharp, J. G., & United States. (2008). The Diary of Michael Shiner relating to the History of the Washington Navy Yard 1813-1865. Washington, D.C: Navy Dept. Library.

External links

 
 
 Eyewitness Account of the Snow Riot
Riots and civil disorder in Washington, D.C.
1835 in Washington, D.C.
1835 riots
August 1835 events
White American riots in the United States
1835 labor disputes and strikes
White American culture in Washington, D.C.
American anti-abolitionist riots and civil disorder
African-American history of Washington, D.C.
Racially motivated violence against African Americans
Anti-black racism in Washington, D.C.